Suicide in Iran is believed to be a growing concern in recent years. According to statistics most of the people who commit suicide are between the ages of 15 and 35.

Economic problems, mental illnesses, cultural obligations, political issues, and social pressures are the major factors for suicide commission in Iran.

Definitions 
The word "suicide" in Persian dictionaries like Moeen, Dehkhoda, and Amid, has been defined as "killing self by any means". The Oxford English Dictionary records the first use of the word "suicide" by Walter Charleton in 1651.
Apparently the word suicide in French was used by Pierre Desfontaines for the first time. Later, this word was accepted by the French Academy of Sciences. Ali EslamiNasab, considers the combination of two Latin words sui (self=) and cide (killing=Persian:کُشتن) a correct term for suicide (self-killing=Persian: خودکشی khudkushi). The concept of suicide in the Moaser Persian Dictionary is defined as "the intentional termination of life by one's own intention and own hands".

The first sociological analysis of suicide has been put forward by the French sociologist, Émile Durkheim. He states in his 1897 book suicide that "suicide is any type of death which is a direct or indirect cause of the victim's own positive or negative acts that he/she was aware of in advance". Durkheim categorized suicides into the following four types all of which are related to the relationship of the individual to society: 1- Egoistic suicide that is the cause of individualism and the separation from the society; 2- Altruistic suicide that occurs when the individual has a deep attachment to the society; 3- Anomic suicide which is the cause of anomie and lawlessness in the society; and 4- Fatalistic suicide that occurs when the wills, emotions and incentives of the members of the society is under the restrict control of the society.

In the late 19th century, Sigmund Freud was the first to review suicide from a psychological point of view. He considered suicide as "the ultimate anger towards self caused by the unconscious". Freud, divided human instincts into two categories: death instinct (Thanatos) and life instinct (Eros). He believed that the death instinct starts immediately after birth and intends to return in the future. This instinct is the cause of extinction, grudge, and termination of generation (reproduction). On the other hand, the life instinct is the cause of friendship, love, and reproduction. Gradually, Freud developed his theory of death instinct, which is in opposition to libido.

Erwin Stengel is the first person to differentiate between suicide and suicide intention from a psychological point of view. After some research, he dedicated an independent branch of psychology to the suicide intention. Research has suggested that unlike suicide the intention of suicide has other goals than just simple "self destruction". Kayral has mentioned the following four goals of suicide intention: 1- an invitation or asking for help and support; 2- a reaction to a disaster or an unexpected catastrophe; 3- abusing or threatening of others; and 4- an escape from a harsh situation. According to Eslaminasab, the following five behaviors of suicide ideation, threatening to commit suicide, suicide gesture (harming oneself), suicide attempt, and death by suicide, are categorized under suicidal behavior.

The term "suicidology" became prevalent in the 1960s. It was first used in 1929 by the Dutch scientist, W. A. Bonger. Suicidology is the scientific study of suicide and its different aspects.

Statistics 
Suicide in Iran is believed to be a growing concern over recent years. According to World Health Organization in 2014 the suicide rate of Iran was 5.3 in every 100,000 people. In that year, the rate of suicide based on gender was 3.6 for women and 7 for men. Seasonally, most suicides occurred in summer with the rate of 35.2% of all suicides; 13% higher than any other season. Based on a meta-analytical research, in Iran, the rate of non-fatal and fatal suicide attempts among married couples is higher than other groups. The statistics provided by the Medical Jurisprudence Organization of Iran show that 54% of suicides ending in death occurred among people under 30 years of age and that people who lived in the cities had statistically higher rates of suicides than people living in rural areas.

Reasons 

According to the field research questionnaires given to the suicidal patients referred to Loghman Hospital from 1970 to 1972, family-related issues, with a prevalence of 56%, were the most important reasons of committing suicide. (Table 1). In this study, family-related issues consisted of conflicts between married couples and their parents, and also improper interpersonal relations between parents and their children or other siblings with each other. Such issues started from the ages of 15 to 19 and were most frequent among 20- to 24-year-olds. These two age periods combined were the cause of 56% of total suicides related to family issues. In general, 81% of suicides related to family issues were committed by youths from 10 to 34 years old. In addition, family-related issues, were the most prevalent reason among children from 10 to 14 years old (33%).

In the aforementioned study (Table 1), love-related issues with a prevalence of 28% were the second most frequent reason of suicide and the most frequent age period was from 15 to 24 (61٪). In this study, housing, unemployment, and educational failure, have been categorized under society-related issues which was the third reason of suicide with the highest frequency in patients from the age of 20  to 24 years old. In this study, financial issues were the lowest cause of suicide with 6% of all committed suicides.

In a study done on 260 suicides referred to the Medical Jurisprudence Organization of Iran in the first half of 2004, according to the answers that the families of these suicide victims provided, the most prevalent reasons for suicide among men were mental disorders (41%) and financial problems (31%); and among women were family conflicts (54%) and mental disorders (31%). The most prevalent mental disorder among both men and women was depression and in 27% of the cases, the victim had a long history of hospitalization.

Demographics

Gender

Women 
Iranian women are more vulnerable to suicide than other groups in the society. In 2007, Iran ranked the third country in which women were outnumbering men in committing suicide.

According to a study published in 2008, women's suicide rate in Iran was double that of men. This study also found that drug overdose is the most popular method of suicide among Iranians; hanging and self-immolation, respectively, are the most popular methods after drug overdose.

Men

Age

Children and teenagers 
Based on Iranian statistics, from 1984 to 1993, nearly 1,500 deaths attributed to suicide of 27,000 deaths among children and teenagers were recorded annually. Teens from 13 to 17 years of age committed most of these suicides and the suicide rate among boys was four times that of girls. The total number of suicides from 1994 to 2001, were 4,250 which showed a large increase from the last mentioned period of time. Jalili, by excluding the exceptional cases, found the total number of teen suicides from 1993 to 2001 to be approximately 3,225 cases; the suicide rate based on gender was 3.7 boys to 1 girl. The most chosen methods of suicide were, respectively, drug poisoning, hanging, jumping from a height, and, very rarely, firearms. Boys chose firearms, explosives, hanging, and suffocation, whereas girls mostly chose poisoning or drug overdose as a method to kill themselves. The most chosen methods of suicides among children were jumping from a height, poisoning, hanging, stabbing, and jumping under vehicles.

In September 2015, Fateme Daneshvar, the director of the social committee of the Islamic City Council of Tehran, declared that from 2002 to 2004, 6 children committed suicide in Tehran. This data is from the Loghman Hospital in Tehran and is for suicides by poisoning for ages 8 to 13. Sociologist Majid Mohammadi considers the following five reasons for Iranian child and teen suicide: 1- conflicts in sexual identity which increases suicide rates among LGBT youths; 2- neglected depression; 3- group pressure and being bullied at school; 4- copycatting the suicide of another person and public hanging of criminals; and 5- Forced marriage in some provinces.

In a field study done on 323 students (159 boys and 164 girls) between the ages of 14 to 17 in the city of Isfahan, which was published in 2001, the prevalence of major depressive disorder among teenagers was nearly 43.4% and suicidal ideation  32.7%. It was revealed that 55.5% of girls and 30.8% of boys had been suffering from mild or severe depression. This study also showed that the highest frequency of suicide ideation (58.3%) was among teenagers who described their parents' behavior to be restrictive (less emotional and more controlling), while the lowest frequency of suicide ideation (11.6%) was among teenagers who described the behavior of their parents to be democratic (more emotional and less controlling). The prevalence of suicide ideation among girls was more than boys (37.7% vs 27.5%, respectively).

Youths 
According to suicide statistics of 2013, which were the most recent until July 2015, 54% of all suicides in Iran were committed by people aged under 30.

A longitudinal study done on students from 2003 to 2008, showed that hanging was the most chosen method and wrist cutting was the least chosen method of suicide. According to this study, single male students aged 22 who were studying Humanities in the Islamic Azad University, had a higher incidence of suicide than any other group. It was found that most of these suicides were committed near the time of the exams and in holidays between semesters.

Methods

Poisoning 

A 2006 study conducted by Ghoreyshi and Mousavi Nasab, showed that 55.8% of the population of 3,477 chose drug overdose as the most preferred method with a median of 55.8% of the total population.

In a meta-analysis study on other studies done until April 2012, Bidel and others found out that from all methods of poisoning, drug overdose with 75% and other poisons (including agricultural and domestic pesticides) with 13% had the most prevalence among suicides. According to this study, provinces of Golestan (90%), Markazi (89%), Razavi Khorasan (88%), and Hormozgan (88%) respectively, ranked the highest in suicide with drug overdose, and provinces of Ilam (25%), Bushehr (21%), and East Azerbaijan (20%) respectively, ranked the highest in suicide with other types of poisons. According to Bidel and others, the reason behind Ilam's high incidences of suicide with agricultural pesticides is because such substances are easily accessible in this province.

Self-immolation 
According to a 2001 report by the medical jurisprudence organization of Iran, self-immolation has been the most chosen method of suicide among women with 69.29% prevalence. This report also states that the highest rate of self-immolation as a method of suicide among men was from Yazd Province with 47% prevalence and the highest suicide rate with this method for women was recorded in Bushehr province with 94.4% prevalence.

In a meta-analysis study consisted of 19 studies with a population of 22,498 suicide cases until 2012, Nazarzade and others have concluded that generally speaking, from all physical methods of suicide, self-immolation, with a prevalence of 13%, is the most chosen method of suicide in Iran. They also found that the provinces of Kohgiluyeh and Boyer-Ahmad (48%), Ilam (28%), and South Khorasan (10%), respectively, ranked the highest rates for self-immolation as a method of killing oneself. According to Nazarzade and others, although suicide by this method in Iran occurs less than in other countries like India (40%), Sri Lanka (24%), and Egypt (17%), the prevalence of this method in Iran is more than some African countries like Zimbabwe (11%) and South Africa and also some European countries like Germany. Their report states that in general and except for poisoning, Iranian men and women tend to use violent methods like self-immolation, hanging, and shooting with firearms for their suicide. The prevalence of these types of methods is higher in western and south-eastern provinces of the country.

Hanging 

Based on a 2001 report from the Medical Jurisprudence Organization of Iran, hanging, with the prevalence of 56.5%, was the most important method of suicide among men.

According to Nazarzade and others, based on a meta-analytical study of other studies conducted during the 1990s and 2000s, (excluding the studies that solely covered fatal suicide attempts), with a population of 22,468 cases of attempted suicides, the prevalence of hanging was only 2%. Based on this study, Kermanshah Province, in 2005 had the highest rate of hanging (17%), while Golestan Province, in 2002, had the lowest rate of hanging (1%). Also, suicide by hanging in Iran occurs less than in western and Asian countries.

The table on the right, shows the frequency of methods used in fatal suicide attempts that were referred to the Medical Jurisprudence Organization of Iran in the first half of 2004. According to this data, the most chosen method of suicide among both men and women in Iran was hanging. (Population= 180 men and 80 women). Among Iranian men who committed suicide, hanging (57%) and poisoning (17%) respectively were the most chosen methods, while for women, poisoning and self-immolation were the most chosen ones, both having nearly the same prevalence.

Firearms 

According to Khademi and others, due to limitations of accessing and using firearms in Iran, suicide by this method, in comparison with other methods such as poisoning, self-immolation, and hanging is less favorable.

Based on the data available from the Medical Jurisprudence Organization of Iran, in 2001, 8% of suicide fatalities involved a type of firearm (269 persons), and in total, the prevalence of this method was 0.42 in every 100,000 people. In the same year, men's suicide rate with this method was 91.4%, whereas with women, it was only 8.6%. Notably, 62% of suicides by shooting occurred in military locations. According to Khademi and others, the subject of suicide by firearms among conscripted soldiers in Iran is problematic and needs to be paid special attention.

Based on statistics from 2001, the provinces of Kermanshah, Ilam, and Lorestan, with 1.71, 1.67, and 1.63 suicides by firearm in every 100,000 people respectively, ranked the highest, and the provinces of Qom, Zanjan, and Mazandaran, with 0, 0, and 0.07 suicides by firearm in every 100,000 people respectively, ranked the lowest. Khademi and others attribute the high level of suicide by shooting in western and eastern provinces to arms trafficking and to the fact that in those provinces, people have easier access to weapons and tools used lethally than those in other provinces.

Sites

Tehran Metro 
In Iran, like other countries, suicide by train occurs. According to authorities, on average, each month one person kills themself by jumping on Tehran's subway railway. For example, on May 15, 2015, a 35-year-old man was injured and brought to hospital after throwing himself under a subway train at Moniryeh Station. On January 16, 2016, a young lady committed suicide in Darvazeh Dolat Station.

Milad Tower 
Before the 1979 Revolution of Iran, places like "Pelasko Building" and "The Aluminum Building" in Tehran were among the favorite sites of suicide by jumping, and it has been said that some famous Iranian people like Sadeq Hedayat and Nosrat Rahmani intended to jump from these buildings. After the revolution, the Milad Tower, which had become the tallest building in Iran, attracted those who wanted to kill themselves by jumping. At least three suicides by jumping from the roof of Milad Tower have been reported.

Dimensions

Legislative 

The act of suicide has not been criminalized in the penal law of the Islamic Republic of Iran. However, no one is permitted to ask another to kill them. In addition, threatening to kill oneself is not an offense under the law, however, if this act of threatening is made by a prisoner inside a prison, then that would be considered a violation of prison regulations and the offender may be punished according to penal law.

According to the Act. 836 of the civil law of the Islamic Republic of Iran, if a suicidal person prepares for suicide and writes a testament, if he/she dies, then by law the will is considered void and if he/she doesn't die, then the will is officially accepted and can be carried out.

According to the theory of "borrowed crime", because suicide itself is not a crime in penal law, thus any type of assisting in an individual's suicide is not considered a crime and the assistant is not punishable. Assisting a suicide is considered a crime only when it becomes the "cause" of the suicidal person's death; for example, when someone takes advantage of someone else's unawareness or simplicity and convinces him/her to kill him/herself. In such cases assisting a suicide is treated as murder and the offender is punished accordingly. In addition, assisting a suicide is considered a crime under section 2 of Act. 15 of the cyber crimes law of the Islamic Republic of Iran which was legislated on June 15, 2009. According to the act, any type of encouragement, stimulation, invitation, simplification of access to lethal substances, and/or methods and teaching of suicide with the help of computer or any other media network is considered assisting in suicide, and thus, is punished by imprisonment from 91 days up to 1 year or fines from 5 to 20 million Iranian rials or both.

Philosophical

Religious 
In Iran it's said by the religious figures that according to the Islamic texts, suicide is a sin, because it would be unthankful of the blessings that God (Allah) has given them.

Cultural 
While suicide is portrayed and discussed in many Iranian classic art works and literature, speaking of it among people is seen as more or less of a taboo. The cases of suicide among people are thought of with both sympathy for the victim and a sense of disdain or shame for the family and close friends of the person.

Artistic 

Sadegh Hedayat, a famous contemporary Iranian writer, has used suicide as a theme in some of his stories such as "Buried alive", "Parvin, daughter of Sasan", and "Darkroom". In the short story, "Buried alive", the narrator of the story wants to be far from mankind. He has found life to be a waste, doesn't have any hope to continue, and is constantly in search of suicide methods. For him, death is the means of achieving calmness. In the play, "Parvin, daughter of Sasan", Parvin is in love with Parviz who is fighting Arabs to stop them from conquering Ray. Finally, Parviz is killed, and Parvin, who is interested by an Arab General, kills herself hopelessly. In the short story "Darkroom", the narrator follow-travels with a strange person who does not want to communicate with people and share in their pleasures; instead, he wants to come back to his mother's uterus. At the end of the story, the narrator finds the strange person's dead body in his oval-shaped jujube-colored room with his feet retracted to his stomach, resembling a fetus.

The Taste of Cherry, a 1997 movie by Abbas Kiarostami that won the Palme d'Or of Cannes Film Festival, is about a man named "Badi'ei" who has the intention to kill himself by overdosing and is searching for someone to pour soil on his dead body after his suicide.

Comparison 
In a 2005 comparative field study between 156 Iranian students with an average age of 16.5 and 167 Swedish students with an average age of 17, it was revealed that Swedish students, in comparison with their Iranian counterparts, had more liberal views towards suicide and considered it a right for any person. Whereas the Iranian students believed that no person is allowed to kill him/herself and those who do, if they survive, they should be punished. Also, Swedish students had a higher rate of acceptance for their friends who survived suicide than their Iranian counterparts. In addition, believing in life after death and the punishment of those who die due to suicide, was more common among the Iranian students than the Swedish students.

Examples

Notable Iranians

In the news

See also 
 suicide crisis

Notes

References

Cited texts 
Books
 
 
 
 
 
Journals
  
 
 
  

Iran